For other places in Texas named Corinth, see Corinth, Texas (disambiguation)

Corinth is a ghost town in Marion County, Texas, United States. In 1936, Corinth had a church, a factory, a school, and several businesses. The school closed in 1955, and by 1962 all that was left of the community was its church and cemetery. By 1983 the church had closed and the cemetery was no longer shown on maps.

References

Geography of Marion County, Texas
Ghost towns in East Texas